For the Love of Horror is a fan convention crossed with a haunted attraction held annually in Manchester, UK that celebrates the horror genre in various formats such as horror films, horror fiction, horror comics, horror video games, and horror cosplay which is organised by UK Events company Monopoly Events.

History and organisation
For the Love of Horror has been running since 2018 when Monopoly Events CEO Andy Kleek saw a gap in the market for an original horror-themed fan convention to run alongside the company's other already successful genre fan convention For the love of Sci-Fi. Kleek liked the idea of haunted attractions, also known as scare attractions, which originally began in England in 1915 but which were made universally popular in America during the 1980s and 1990s, and wanted to combine something similar with a standard fan convention like the company's already well established For the Love of Sci-Fi science fiction themed convention held since 2015 in Bowlers Exhibition Centre in Manchester.

Monopoly Events is a Manchester-based event organization company that specializes in events held in the North West of England and Scotland. Along with the For the Love of Horror event, they are also responsible for organizing Comic Con Liverpool, Comic Con Scotland, For the Love of Wrestling, For the Love of Sci-Fi, For the Love of Fantasy, and Comic Con Manchester. The first For the Love of Horror event ran over two consecutive days in October 2018 and was well received by the public for a relatively unknown event, with approximately 5,000 visitors across the weekend.

The convention consistently includes celebrity guest appearances from various horror films, television shows, horror video games including classic franchises such as Friday the 13th, Halloween, The Lost Boys, Candyman, Saw, Child's Play, The Walking Dead and others.

Notable events
House of 1000 Corpses actor Sid Haig was due to appear at the 2019 event, but passed away the month before on September 21, 2019, from Aspiration Pneumonitis triggered by Aspergillus Pneumonia at the age of 80. Haig was due to appear alongside fellow co-star Bill Moseley who still attended the event next to Haig's empty signing table, which was kept as a mark of respect for the actor.  Fan's were invited to visit Haig's table to sign a memorial book and encouraged to leave a donation (which was eventually given to Haig's wife) in exchange for an especially designed poster of the actor commissioned for the event.  The event also observed a one minute silence in honor of Haig during the event on both days at 12pm GMT which rendered the entire event silent.

While originally advertised as a non-specific horror fan convention as per the 2018 event, the 2019 For the love of Horror quickly became known and advertised as the "biggest Lost Boys reunion in history" as the vast majority of the 1987 movie's cast including actors Kiefer Sutherland, Jason Patric, Alex Winter, Jamison Newlander, and Billy Wirth along with musicians from the film G Tom Mac, and Tim Cappello, appeared at the event and were reunited for the first time in over 30 years. Both G Tom Mac and Tom Cappello performed separate live music sets on the event stage to a vast crowd of fans on both days of the event, while Cappello performed a third time at the event after-party. The entire cast posed together for photographs in a purpose-built 'cave' set modeled on the vampire cave seen in The Lost Boys original movie which was complete with a poster of Jim Morrison, a bottle of fake blood and David the vampire's wheelchair.

The 2021 event included an actual and non-staged fan wedding, live on stage in front of thousands of attendees. Musician and Lost Boys actor Tim Cappello appeared on stage at the end of the ceremony to congratulate the couple.

Corey Taylor, of the bands Slipknot and Stonesour among others, was announced as a guest for the event in early 2022. He appeared in a pre-event concert as well as at a signing table during the actual event, and fans were also able to meet Taylor and have photo opportunities with him.

Venue
For the Love of Horror is held exclusively at Bowlers Exhibition Centre, situated in Trafford Park, Stretford, Greater Manchester. The venue is also the site of many raves and music events including Sidewinder and Manchester Adored, conventions such as For the Love of Sci-Fi and Comic Con Manchester, various food and drink expositions and regular boxing and mixed martial arts (MMA) events, dart's championships and tours and other sporting events. It is also home to a gym with a boxing ring, a Caribbean themed cafe-bar and a fan-built replica of the Mos Eisley Cantina from the Star Wars universe which doubles as a functioning bar and an escape room.

The event runs across the entirety of the arena, including the Cantina Space Bar, which is often used for after-parties as well as being open to visitors for the duration of the event. The main exhibition hall, Trafford Arena 1 is home to various film sets (something for which the Monopoly Events is famous for, making their event experiences very different from others like them within the UK), a stage for celebrity guest question and answer panels and also live music performances, celebrity guest professional photoshoots and autograph sessions, cosplay events, and other displays. As of 2019, the smaller Trafford Arena 2 features a large dealers zone selling horror-related memorabilia, artwork and collectibles, prior to this the scare maze could be found in this area while the dealers area could be found in the main exhibit hall, for the 2019 event, the decision was made to move the scare maze into the slightly smaller Bridgewater Arena to allow for more room for visitors in the dealers zone. A smaller suite called the Trafford Suite is home to various horror-themed props that are in place for fans to take free photographs while a small funfair can be found at the front of the venue as well as a food court area.

Location, dates and notable guests

See also
 List of horror conventions
 Horror convention
 Fan convention
 List of multigenre conventions

References

External links
 
 Monopoly Events Official Website

Fan conventions
Horror conventions
Recurring events established in 2018
British fan conventions
Annual events in the United Kingdom